Petar Velikov (born March 30, 1951 in Dobrich) is a Bulgarian chess player, who won the Bulgarian Chess Championship in 1987. He has represented Bulgaria in four Chess Olympiads (1982, 1984, 1986, 1990) and was awarded the Grandmaster title in 1982.

Tournament victories

Ulm 1971;
Wrocław 1976;
Reggio Emilia 1980;
Primorsko 1986;
Acropolis 1989;
Besançon 2003;
Paris 2004;
Paris 2005.

References

External links

1951 births
Chess grandmasters
Chess Olympiad competitors
Living people
Bulgarian chess players
People from Dobrich